Lariño is the name of a settlement in San Martiño parroquia in the province of Galicia, Spain, near A Coruña. It also is home to its beach Playa de Lariño.

Lariño is also a Spanish surname that was originally derived from the Etruscan surname Larino.

References

Surnames